Changnienia is a genus of flowering plants from the orchid family, Orchidaceae. Only one species is known, Changnienia amoena, native to China (provinces of Anhui, Hubei, Hunan, Jiangsu, Jiangxi, Shaanxi, Sichuan, and Zhejiang).

See also
 List of Orchidaceae genera

References

Further reading
 Pridgeon, A.M., Cribb, P.J., Chase, M.A. & Rasmussen, F. eds. (1999). Genera Orchidacearum 1. Oxford Univ. Press.
 Pridgeon, A.M., Cribb, P.J., Chase, M.A. & Rasmussen, F. eds. (2001). Genera Orchidacearum 2. Oxford Univ. Press.
 Pridgeon, A.M., Cribb, P.J., Chase, M.A. & Rasmussen, F. eds. (2003). Genera Orchidacearum 3. Oxford Univ. Press
 Berg Pana, H. 2005. Handbuch der Orchideen-Namen. Dictionary of Orchid Names. Dizionario dei nomi delle orchidee. Ulmer, Stuttgart

External links

Calypsoinae
Orchids of China
Monotypic Epidendroideae genera
Calypsoinae genera